Rosearik Rikki Allen Simons (born September 8, 1970) is an American voice actor, writer, cartoonist, and animator. He is best known as the voice of GIR in the Nickelodeon animated series, Invader Zim. Simons has also written a number of novels and comic series, often working with his wife, Tavisha Wolfgarth-Simons.

Biography

Invader Zim and other voice work 
Simons was the color designer for the animated TV show Invader Zim, and also voiced the robot character of GIR on the show. Show creator Jhonen Vasquez wanted someone with no experience in voice acting to play the part of GIR, as a reflection of how broken and messed up GIR really is. Vasquez was disappointed with actors who auditioned for GIR saying they were "good actors" who just did a "stock crazy robot voice". Simons was Vasquez's friend and was working on I Feel Sick with him, and he asked Simons to try to audition for GIR, saying he "couldn't screw it up anymore than anyone else".

Simons did a few different voices for his audition for GIR, including one where he was trying to imitate his mother-in-law, but decided it was too "shrieky". He then remembered when he used to play with hand puppets with his father as a kid and tried to do one of those voices. Vasquez said he gave Simons the part of GIR because he was "bad at it", and that fit the character. When voicing GIR, Simons' voice was edited to make it sound higher-pitched and metallic. While Simons eventually learned to perform the voice without the high-pitch editing, the metallic quality still had to be added. Unedited versions of Simons' voice-overs can be heard in voice recordings for the unfinished episodes.

Simons said in a 2004 interview that he approached the role of GIR "by pretending (which didn't take much effort) that it wasn't a job... A lot of people comment that I sound like I was just making things up on the spot. That's partly true, but I'm not a voice actor... while I did the voice-actor thing of taking his direction on inflection and I read the lines provided, I was really having the best time ever just yelling and screaming and being stupid."

Simons reprised his role of GIR in a number of video games and in a 2019 movie, Invader Zim: Enter the Florpus. In 2011, Nickelodeon approached Rikki Simons, the voice of GIR, about doing some animated shorts revolving around GIR. While Simons was open to reprising his role, nothing ever came of these shorts for unknown reasons. During an Invader Zim panel at Long Beach Comic Con 2019, Simons said the reason why these GIR shorts never went anywhere might have been because "It's kinda weird to do GIR by himself. I don't know what that would be."

Simons was also involved in the Invader Zim comic series; he was credited as a writer in issue #0 of the Invader Zim comic series as well as a colorist for two issues.

Simons has gone on to other voice acting roles, including on the cartoon Mighty Magiswords and the 2021 video game Psychonauts 2.

 Comics and writing 
Simons has written multiple novels and comics. Many of these are illustrated or co-illustrated by Simon's wife, illustrator Tavisha Wolfgarth-Simons.

Works

 Acting 
Unless otherwise noted, all roles below are voice acting.

 Colorist 
 I Feel Sick (comic book series,1999–2000)
 Invader Zim (TV show, color designer, 2001–2006)
Invader Zim, comic book series, colorist for issues #0 and #3Jackie Chan Adventures (2002–2003) – color stylist for 15 episodes of the TV series

Writer
 ShutterBox (writer, co-artist) (2003–2005)
 Super Information Hijinks: Reality Check! (1995–2002) - comic book series, illustrated by Tavisha Wolfgarth-Simons 
 Ranklechick and His Three-Legged Cat (2006) - novel, with illustrations by Tavisha Wolfgarth-SimonsTrinkkits - webcomic
 Hitherto a Lion (2011) - novel, with illustrations by Tavisha Wolfgarth-Simons.

References

External links
 
 
 Rikki Simons's Newsarama Interview
 Rikki Simons's character design from Invader ZIM'': by Aaron Alexovich.: , by Aaron A. and John Fountain: 

1970 births
American male voice actors
People from San Bernardino County, California
Living people
American comics artists
American comics writers
21st-century American novelists
American male novelists
American graphic novelists
American webcomic creators
21st-century American male writers
Novelists from California
Nickelodeon people